Solis is a census-designated place (CDP) in Cameron County, Texas, United States. The population was 512 at the 2010 census. It is part of the Brownsville–Harlingen Metropolitan Statistical Area.

Geography
The CDP has two separate sections, northern and southern, separated by an extension of the La Feria city limits, which follow the Interstate 2/U.S. Route 83 freeway west from the city center. Solis is bordered to the north by the Ratamosa CDP.

Demographics
As of the census of 2000, there were 545 people, 163 households, and 127 families residing in the CDP. The population density was 259.3 people per square mile (100.2/km2). There were 208 housing units at an average density of 99.0/sq mi (38.2/km2). The racial makeup of the CDP was 80.92% White, 0.18% Pacific Islander, 16.15% from other races, and 2.75% from two or more races. Hispanic or Latino of any race were 72.66% of the population.

There were 163 households, out of which 41.7% had children under the age of 18 living with them, 59.5% were married couples living together, 14.7% had a female householder with no husband present, and 21.5% were non-families. 17.8% of all households were made up of individuals, and 9.8% had someone living alone who was 65 years of age or older. The average household size was 3.34 and the average family size was 3.90.

In the CDP, the population was spread out, with 34.3% under the age of 18, 12.3% from 18 to 24, 25.7% from 25 to 44, 15.4% from 45 to 64, and 12.3% who were 65 years of age or older. The median age was 30 years. For every 100 females, there were 101.9 males. For every 100 females age 18 and over, there were 91.4 males.

The median income for a household in the CDP was $34,861, and the median income for a family was $42,031. Males had a median income of $31,250 versus $25,417 for females. The per capita income for the CDP was $10,319. None of the families and 5.9% of the population were living below the poverty line, including no under eighteens and 41.1% of those over 64.

Education
Solis is served by the La Feria Independent School District.

In addition, South Texas Independent School District operates magnet schools that serve the community.

References

Census-designated places in Cameron County, Texas
Census-designated places in Texas